Cezary Śmiglak (born 13 April 1953) is a Polish former breaststroke swimmer. He competed at the 1972 Summer Olympics and the 1976 Summer Olympics.

References

External links
 

1953 births
Living people
Polish male breaststroke swimmers
Olympic swimmers of Poland
Swimmers at the 1972 Summer Olympics
Swimmers at the 1976 Summer Olympics
Sportspeople from Poznań